Nigeria Airways Flight 2120 was a chartered passenger flight from Jeddah, Saudi Arabia, to Sokoto, Nigeria, on 11 July 1991, which caught fire shortly after takeoff from King Abdulaziz International Airport and crashed while attempting to return for an emergency landing, killing all 247 passengers and 14 crew members on board. The aircraft was a Douglas DC-8 operated by Nationair Canada for Nigeria Airways. Flight 2120 is the deadliest accident involving a DC-8 and remains the deadliest aviation disaster involving a Canadian airline.

Aircraft and crew
The aircraft involved in the accident was a 1968 Douglas DC-8-61, C-GMXQ, owned by the Canadian company Nolisair, usually operated by Nationair Canada. At the time of the accident, it was being wet-leased to Nigeria Airways, which in turn subleased it to Holdtrade Services to transport Nigerian pilgrims to and from Mecca.

William Allan, the 47-year-old captain, a former Royal Canadian Air Force pilot, had logged 10,700 flight hours and 1,000 hours in type. Kent Davidge, the 36-year-old first officer, had logged 8,000 flight hours, of which 550 hours were in type, and was the pilot flying on the accident flight. Victor Fehr, the 46-year-old flight engineer, had logged 7,500 flight hours, of which 1,000 hours were in type.

Accident
The aircraft departed King Abdulaziz International Airport bound for Sadiq Abubakar III International Airport in Sokoto, but problems were reported shortly after takeoff. Unknown to the crew, the aircraft had caught fire during departure, and though the fire was not obvious, since it started in an area without fire warning systems, the effects were numerous. Pressurization failed quickly, and the crew was deluged with nonsensical warnings caused by fire-related circuit failures. This mix-up, a result of Captain Allan mistakenly identifying as "Nationair 2120" rather than "Nigerian 2120," lasted for three minutes, but was ultimately found not to have had any effect on the outcome.

Amidst this, First Officer Davidge, who had been flying C-GMXQ out, reported that he was losing hydraulics. The crew only became aware of the fire when a flight attendant rushed into the cockpit reporting "smoke in the back ... real bad". Shortly afterwards, Davidge reported that he had lost ailerons, forcing Allan to take control; as Allan took over, the cockpit voice recorder failed. At this moment, the air traffic controller realized that Flight 2120 was not the Saudia flight and was in trouble, and directed them towards the runway. Allan subsequently contacted air traffic control multiple times; among his communications was a request for emergency vehicles.

Just  short of the runway, the melting aircraft finally became uncontrollable and crashed, killing whatever portion of the 261 occupants on board—including 247 passengers— who had not already suffocated or fallen out of the aircraft. Nine of the 14 crew were identified, but "no attempt was made to identify the passengers".

, the accident remains the deadliest crash involving a Douglas DC-8, as well as the second-deadliest accident taking place on Saudi Arabian soil, after Saudia Flight 163.

Cause
Prior to departure, the lead mechanic had noticed that the "No. 2 and No. 4 tyre pressures were below the minimum for flight dispatch", and attempted to inflate them, but no nitrogen gas was readily available. The project manager, unwilling to accept a delay, disregarded the problem and readied the aircraft for dispatch. As the aircraft was taxiing, the transfer of the load from the underinflated No. 2 tire to the No. 1 tire on the same portside axle resulted "in overdeflection, overheating, and structural weakening of the No. 1 tyre". "The No. 1 tyre failed very early on the take-off roll," followed almost immediately by the No. 2. The latter stopped rotating "for reasons not established", and the subsequent friction of the wheel assembly with the runway generated sufficient heat to start a self-sustaining fire.

The crew realised they had a problem, but not the nature or seriousness of it. The aircraft was not equipped with fire or heat sensors in the wheel assembly. The first officer was recorded remarking, "We got a flat tire, you figure?" According to Transportation Safety Board of Canada members interviewed for an episode of Mayday about the accident, standard procedures regarding tire failure during the takeoff roll on the DC-8 did not include rejecting take-off for tire or wheel failures, so the captain proceeded with the take-off.

Due to common jet aircraft design, the accident became inevitable the moment the landing gear was retracted, mere seconds after takeoff and long before an emergency became apparent. When this occurred, "burning rubber was brought into close proximity with hydraulic and electrical system components," causing the failure of both hydraulic and pressurisation systems that led to structural damage and loss of control of the aircraft. The Transportation Safety Board later concluded, "had the crew left the landing gear extended, the accident might have been averted." Fuel, "probably introduced as a result of 'burn through' of the centre fuel tank", intensified the fire, which eventually consumed the cabin floor. People began falling out of the aircraft when their seat harnesses burned through. "Despite the considerable destruction to the airframe, the aircraft appeared to have been controllable until just before the crash."

The investigation discovered  that the mechanics had known about the underinflated tires since 7 July, but that the project manager, lacking the relevant training to make an informed decision, had prevented maintenance on the tires because the aircraft was behind schedule, requiring them to record false pressure readings in the log to make the aircraft seem airworthy. This meant that Nationair Canada executives had pressured the colleagues of the cockpit crew to withhold information that had serious safety implications.

Aftermath
Soon after the accident, a group of Toronto-based Nationair Canada flight attendants pooled funds to create a memorial plaque, inscribed with the names of the victims. The memorial, complete with a cherry tree planted to commemorate their colleagues who died in Jeddah, was given a permanent home at the head office of the Greater Toronto Airports Authority.

The aircrash, combined with Nationair Canada's poor reputation for on-time service and mechanical problems, led to serious problems with public image and reliability among tour operators. These difficulties were compounded when Nationair Canada locked out its unionised flight attendants and proceeded to replace them with strikebreakers on 19 November 1991. The lock-out lasted 15 months, and by the time it ended in early 1993, Nationair Canada found itself in severe financial trouble. At the time, Nationair Canada owed the Canadian government millions of dollars in unpaid landing fees. Creditors began seizing aircraft and demanded cash up front for services. The company was declared bankrupt in May 1993, owing CDN$75 million.

In 1997, Robert Obadia, owner of Nationair Canada and its parent company Nolisair, pleaded guilty to eight counts of fraud in relation to the company's activities.

In popular culture
An episode of Mayday in 2012, titled "Under Pressure", covered the accident.

See also
 Aviation safety
 List of accidents and incidents involving airliners by location
 List of aircraft accidents and incidents resulting in at least 50 fatalities

References

External links
 Cockpit Voice Recorder Database
 Nationair history site
 

Aviation accidents and incidents in 1991
1991 in Saudi Arabia
Aviation accidents and incidents in Saudi Arabia
Aviation in Nigeria
Airliner accidents and incidents caused by maintenance errors
Airliner accidents and incidents caused by in-flight fires
Accidents and incidents involving the Douglas DC-8
Nigeria Airways accidents and incidents
July 1991 events in Asia
1991 disasters in Saudi Arabia